The Redding Rancheria is a federally recognized tribe with a reservation in Shasta County, Northern California. It is a leader in the development of their people in their traditional homelands. The Bureau of Indian Affairs purchased the land that is now considered the Redding Rancheria in 1922, in order to provide Indigenous peoples with a place to camp and live. They had been made landless by European-American settlers in the area. Three groups of Native Americans in the area organized as a tribe and were recognized in 1979.

Description
The Redding Rancheria consists of Wintu, Achomawi (Pit River), and Yana Indians. Redding Rancheria was recognized as a tribe following a four-year lawsuit filed by Tillie Hardwick in 1979. It is located in the northern Sacramento Valley, near Redding.

Government 
The Redding Rancheria has a constitution, adopted in 1989, signed by Bob Foreman the First tribal chairman.  It is governed by seven Councilors and three Alternate Councilors, elected by the membership. The current tribal administration is as follows.

 Tribal Chairman – Jack Potter, Jr.
 Vice Chairman – Michelle Hayward
 Secretary – Patty Spaulding
 Treasurer – Hope Wilkes
 Council Member – Jason Hayward, Jr.
 Council Member – Tony Hayward, Sr.
 Council Member – Laine Hayward 
 1st Alternate –  Nicole Wilkes
 2nd Alternate – Jason Hayward, Sr.
 3rd Alternate – Miranda Edwards

Economic development
The Redding Rancheria established the Win-River Resort & Casino along California State Route 273, near Interstate 5 between Redding and Anderson. It has produced significant revenue for the tribe, enabling capital payments to each member.

Membership dispute 

The Redding Rancheria's 1989 constitution states that it shall consist of all lineal descents of the 17 original distributees, who are listed on the plan of distribution dated October 8, 1959. This established the land as a reservation. 

In 2002 an elder wrote a letter questioning the lineage of the Foreman family, as she said its claimed ancestor, the late Virginia Timmons, had no children. This challenged the enrollment of Lorena Foreman, once a member of the tribal council, along with the descendants. In September of 2003, the tribe held an evidentiary hearing and later an anonymous vote on disenrollment by all adult members of the tribe. The constitution states, "All members of the Redding Rancheria who are eighteen (18) years of age or older shall be qualified voters in elections and General Meetings." But the Timmons' descendants were not allowed to vote on the issue. 

The family had provided documentation and noted that birth records (which the tribe had asked for) were rare for Native Americans at that time. The Foreman family was supported by the Bureau of Indian Affairs, which wrote to the tribe and tribal chair Tracy Edwards. The Redding Rancheria was still requiring DNA. 

The Foremans presented family records, witnesses, testimony from two anthropologists specializing in California Native Americans, and proof that their family members' names were listed as related on the 1928 California Judgement roll (a state census that recorded all Native people). The family contacted a world-renowned DNA scientist, known for helping to identify victims of the 9/11 terror attacks at the World Trade Center. 

Virginia Timmons, the family’s matriarch whose membership in the tribe was undisputed, was the first to be exhumed. She had been buried so long that the team was unsure if a DNA sample could be obtained, but a bone sample yielded some. Virginia’s DNA was compared to a living descendant. The results came back 99.9% positive. The DNA results were presented to the tribe. The Foremans thought it was bulletproof. But after two years of fighting, the family was notified that they would officially be disenrolled following a vote from the general tribe.

Education
The ranchería is served by the Cascade Union Elementary School District and Anderson Union High School District.

See also 
Indigenous peoples of California
Pit River tribes

References

External links
Redding Rancheria website
Redding Rancheria Disenrollment
The Redding Rancheria Documentary: "With the Strength of our Ancestors" — on Redding Rancheria's website.
Trail Of Tears- Foreman Family
L.A. Times Article - Redding Rancheria

Wintun
Yana
Pit River tribes
Federally recognized tribes in the United States
Populated places in Shasta County, California
American Indian reservations in California
Shasta County, California

Sovereign immunity
DNA
Anthropologists